Huang Ying (黄莹, born 2 July 1977) is a retired Chinese rhythmic gymnast. She represented China at the 1996 Summer Olympics.

References

External links
 Huang Ying Bio, Stats, and Results

Chinese rhythmic gymnasts
1977 births
Olympic gymnasts of China
Gymnasts at the 1996 Summer Olympics
Sportspeople from Nanjing
living people
20th-century Chinese women
21st-century Chinese women